Friedrich Michau (born 26 July 1979) is a German international rugby union player, playing for the FC St. Pauli Rugby in the 2nd Rugby-Bundesliga and the German national rugby union team.

He made his last game for Germany on 28 April 2007 against the Netherlands.

He is the captain of the FC St. Pauli rugby team.

Honours

National team
 European Nations Cup - Division 2
 Champions: 2008

Stats
Friedrich Michau's personal statistics in club and international rugby:

Club

 As of 30 April 2012

National team

 As of 30 March 2010

References

External links
 Friedrich Michau at scrum.com
 Friedrich Michau at totalrugby.de

1979 births
Living people
German rugby union players
Germany international rugby union players
DRC Hannover players
Rugby union in Hamburg
Rugby union fly-halves